Kendrick Ladell Starling (born December 27, 1979) is a former American football wide receiver.

Early years and high school
Starling was born and raised in Marshall, Texas. He graduated from Marshall High School in 1999 and played football and ran track in high school.

College career
Starling began his collegiate career at Navarro College, a junior college in Corsicana, Texas. In his two seasons at Navarro, Starling was a two-time first-team All-NJCAA selection with 111 receptions for 2,305 yards and 26 touchdowns. After signing with Marshall University in 2001, Starling did not play a game for the Marshall Thundering Herd football team and transferred to San José State University in 2002.

As a junior in 2002, Starling made 49 receptions for 603 yards and 5 touchdowns. He also rushed for 36 yards on 5 carries and returned 16 kickoffs for 294 yards. As a senior in 2003, Starling made 28 receptions for 295 yards and rushed 12 yards in 5 carries, including a touchdown. He also returned 20 kickoffs for 562 yards.

Professional career

Starling was signed as an undrafted free agent by the Texans in 2004.  He played in eight games for the Texans in his rookie year.  Mainly used on special teams, Starling returned one kickoff for 14 yards and made four tackles on special teams. From September 21 to November 17, he played on the practice squad.

The Seattle Seahawks signed Starling to the practice squad on September 4, 2005 and released Starling on September 20. Starling later signed with the New Orleans Saints and was assigned to practice squad before being waived on December 16, 2005.

Starling played for the Rhein Fire in Düsseldorf after being allocated by the Texans January 13, 2006. On January 28, 2006, he was drafted by the Rhein Fire of NFL Europa in the fourth-round. With Rhein, Starling made 13 receptions for 320 yards and 3 touchdowns. The Texans waived Starling on August 28, 2006.

Starling signed with the Edmonton Eskimos of the Canadian Football League on May 24, 2007.

Legal troubles
On October 6, 2021, the Marshall News Messenger'' reported that a Harrison County, Texas grand jury indicted Starling "for the offense of continuous sexual abuse of a child." Starling was arrested in February 2021 after surrendering himself to the Marshall Police Department.

References

1979 births
Living people
American football wide receivers
American players of Canadian football
Canadian football wide receivers
Edmonton Elks players
Houston Texans players
Navarro Bulldogs football players
People from Marshall, Texas
Players of American football from Texas
Rhein Fire players
San Jose State Spartans football players